The Minister of State at the Department of Social Protection is a junior ministerial post in the Department of Social Protection of the Government of Ireland who may perform functions delegated by the Minister for Social Protection. A Minister of State does not hold cabinet rank.

There are currently two Ministers of State:
 Joe O'Brien, TD – Minister of State with special responsibility for Community development and charities; and
 Neale Richmond, TD –  Minister of State with special responsibility for Employment affairs and retail business

List of Parliamentary Secretaries

List of Ministers of State

References

Social Protection
Department of Social Protection